2019 Delhi fire may refer to:

Delhi hotel fire, in February
Delhi factory fire, in December